This is a list of shows that have been broadcast on the former channel Chiller.

Original
 AHHH Zombies
 Can You Survive a Horror Movie?
 Real Fear: The Truth Behind the Movies
 Scare Tactics
 Slasher

Movies
 Chiller 13: The Decade's Scariest Movie Moments
 Chiller 13: Horror's Creepiest Kids
 Steve Niles' Remains

Acquired

 13: Fear Is Real
 666 Park Avenue
 Alfred Hitchcock Presents
 All Souls
 American Gothic
 The American Scream
 Apparitions
 Beauty and the Beast
 Being Human
 Beyond Belief: Fact or Fiction
 Black Blood Brothers
 Brimstone
 Buffy the Vampire Slayer
 Children of Darkness
 Dark Realm
 Dead Like Me
 Descendants of Darkness
 Devil May Cry: The Animated Series
 Fear Factor
 Forever Knight
 Freakylinks
 Freddy's Nightmares
 Friday the 13th: The Series
 The Future of Fear
 The Gates
 Ghost Hunters
 Ghost Whisperer
 Ghoul
 Good vs Evil
 Harper's Island
 Haunted
 Haven
 Hex
 The Hunger
 Invasion
 Is This a Zombie?
 Kindred: The Embraced
 Kolchak: The Night Stalker
 Lost Girl
 Masters of Horror
 Millennium
 Monster
 Monsters
 Most Daring
 The New Alfred Hitchcock Presents
 The New Twilight Zone
 Night Gallery
 Night Stalker
 Night Visions
 Nightmare Cafe
 The Nightmare Room
 The Others
 The Outer Limits (1963)
 The Outer Limits (1995)
 Persons Unknown
 Poltergeist: The Legacy
 Profit
 Pushing Daisies
 Ripley's Believe It Or Not!
 Sanctuary
 Scare Tactics
 Scary... But True!
 Sea of Souls
 The Secret Circle
 The Sixth Sense
 Spine Chillers
 Strange
 Strange World
 Tales from the Crypt
 Tales from the Darkside
 Todd and the Book of Pure Evil
 Tokko
 Tokyo Majin
 Tru Calling
 The Twilight Zone
 Twin Peaks
 Unexplained Mysteries
 War of the Worlds
 Werewolf
 Wolf Lake
 World's Most Amazing Videos
 The X-Files

References

Chiller